T. L. V. Prasad is an Indian film director who predominantly worked in Hindi and Telugu cinema.. He is the director of nearly 70 Hindi films and 35 Telugu films. He also directed a few films in Bengali.

Career 

He is the son of noted Telugu director T. Prakash Rao. He started his career by assisting V. Madhusudhana Rao and made his directorial debut in 1980 with the Telugu film, Kudi Edamaithe. His Bollywood career started in 1992, with I Love You. His name is included in Limca Book of Records, as one director doing so many numbers of films with one hero (Mithun) without a break in a short span. He did four Bengali Films with Mithun in 2004. He was one of the prominent directors for Mithun's popular Mithun's Dream Factory.

Filmography

Telugu 
 Kudi Edamaithe - Nutan Prasad, Phataphat Jayalakshmi
 Challenge Ramudu - N. T. Rama Rao, Jaya Prada
 Rani Kasula Rangamma - Chiranjeevi, Sridevi
 Tingu Rangadu - Chiranjeevi, Geetha
 Manishiko Charitra  - Murali Mohan, Suhasini
 Manishiki MaroPeru - Chandra Mohan, Tulasi
 Ee Teerpu Illalidi - Mohan Babu, Sujata
 Illali Pareeksha - Mohan Babu, Bhanupriya
 Illale Devata - Akkineni Nageswara Rao, Raadhika
 Disco King - Balakrishna, Tulasi
 Palnati Puli - Balakrishna, Bhanupriya
 Naagu - Chiranjeevi, Radha
 Subha Muhoortam - Murali Mohan, Suhasini
 Ramanayamlo Bhagavatam - Gollapudi Maruti Rao, Bhanupriya
 Aakrandana - Chandra Mohan, Jayasudha
 Dharma Patni - Suman, Bhanupriya
 Maa Inti Mahalakshmi - Mohan Babu, Radha
 Paragitha - Anand Babu, Jayasudha
 Ragam Talam Pallavi - Chandra Mohan
 Qaidi Dada - Suman, Radha
 Illali Pratigya - Naresh, Tulasi

Hindi & Bengali

Marathi 
 Vrundavan (2016)

Television
Jai Jai Jai Bajrang Bali (Sahara One)
Jai Shri Krishna (Sahara One)

Notes 

 Source:Details at ApunKaChoice

External links 

 

￼

1952 births
Living people
Film directors from Andhra Pradesh
Film producers from Andhra Pradesh
Telugu film directors
Hindi-language film directors
Bengali film directors
Marathi film directors
20th-century Indian film directors
Artists from Vijayawada